Wonder Bar is a 1934 American pre-Code film adaptation of a Broadway musical of the same name directed by Lloyd Bacon with musical numbers created by Busby Berkeley.

It stars Al Jolson, Kay Francis, Dolores del Río, Ricardo Cortez, Dick Powell, Guy Kibbee, Ruth Donnelly, Hugh Herbert, Louise Fazenda, Fifi D'Orsay, Merna Kennedy, Henry O'Neill, Robert Barrat, Henry Kolker, and Spencer Charters in the main roles. For its time, Wonder Bar was considered risqué, barely passing the censors at the Hays Office. The title is a pun on "wunderbar," which is German for "wonderful."

Plot
Wonder Bar is set in a Parisian nightclub, with the stars playing the 'regulars' at the club. The movie revolves around two main story points, a romance and a more serious conflict with death, and several minor plots. All of the stories are enlivened from time to time by extravagant musical numbers. The more serious story revolves around Captain Von Ferring (Robert Barrat), a German military officer. Ferring has gambled on the stock market and lost, now broke after dozens of failed investments, he is at the Wonder Bar to try and pull a one-night stand before killing himself the following day. Al Wonder (Al Jolson) knows about Ferring's plan.

Meanwhile, an elaborate romance is unfolding. The bar's central attraction is the Latin lounge dancing group led by Inez (Dolores del Río). Al Wonder has a secret attraction to Inez, who has a burning passion for Harry (Ricardo Cortez). However, Harry is two-timing her with Liane (Kay Francis), who is married to the famous French banker Renaud (Henry Kolker). The story comes to a climax when Inez finds out that Harry and Liane plan to run away together and head to the United States. Inez, in a haze of jealousy, kills Harry.

Subplots are much lighter in nature. They involve several drunken routines by two businessmen (Hugh Herbert and an uncredited Hobart Cavanaugh) and Al Wonder's various narrations as emcee of the floor show and manager of the club.

Cast

Al Jolson as Al Wonder
Kay Francis as Liane
Dolores del Río as Inez
Ricardo Cortez as Harry
Dick Powell as Tommy
Guy Kibbee as Simpson
Ruth Donnelly as Mrs. Simpson
Hugh Herbert as Pratt
Louise Fazenda as Mrs. Pratt
Fifi D'Orsay as Mitzi
Merna Kennedy as Claire
Henry O'Neill as Richard - the Maitre'd
Robert Barrat as Captain Hugo Von Ferring
Henry Kolker as Mr. R.H. Renaud
Spencer Charters as Pete

Pre-Code uncensored scenes
Two scenes stand above the rest. One was the blackface minstrel show finale, "Goin' to Heaven on a Mule" (featuring Jolson and Hal Le Roy), full of racial stereotypes. The other involved a handsome man, asking a dancing couple if he could cut in. The female partner, expecting his attention, agrees, only to see him dance with her male partner. Jolson then flaps his wrist and says, "Boys will be boys! Woo!" This scene almost caused the Production Code to reject the film, and was featured in the opening scenes of the documentary film The Celluloid Closet (1996).

Production
The various scenes of Wonder Bar are permeated by musical numbers which were designed and directed by Busby Berkeley. Most of the musical numbers were typically 1930s; big-band led by an entertaining band director (Al), with lavish costumes packed with showgirls (the trailers promised 'over 250 of the world's most beautiful women').

Reception
The film was one of Warners biggest hits of the year. According to Warner Bros records it earned $1,264,000 domestically and $771,000 internationally.

See also
 Busby Berkeley using alternate takes to circumvent censorship

References

External links

1934 films
1934 crime drama films
1930s musical drama films
American crime drama films
American musical drama films
American romantic drama films
American romantic musical films
American black-and-white films
Blackface minstrel shows and films
1930s English-language films
Films based on musicals
Films directed by Lloyd Bacon
First National Pictures films
Warner Bros. films
1930s romantic musical films
1930s American films